Art Mann Presents was a reality travel show on AXS TV (formerly HDNet) hosted by Art Mann. It featured eclectic public party events and festivals in North America. Mann's persona is a straight-shooting "everyman" reporter who interviews colorful, often inebriated, characters he meets at the events. Art Mann Presents has aired on HDNet/AXS TV since February 2005  and has been out of production since December 2015.

Events visited have included Mardi Gras festivities in New Orleans and various other cities, Bay to Breakers, the Indianapolis 500, and tailgate parties at Jimmy Buffett concerts and other shows and sports events.

The network had also aired an uncensored late-night version of the show featuring ample female nudity, Art Mann Presents: Unrated, until HDNet became AXS TV in July, 2012, and in accordance with the network format changing to a more gender-neutral live entertainment focus, the explicit version was dropped from the schedule.

Notable guest stars on the program have included Carmen Electra, Jesse Jane, Jessica Mathews, and Kimberly Fisher.

While no new information regarding the show's status and whether or not it will ever return is known, Art Mann Presents has a new home on Youtube airing partial clips from the series.

References

External links

 Youtube

2005 American television series debuts
2000s American reality television series
2010s American reality television series
HDNet original programming
English-language television shows
2015 American television series endings